The Cross of Saint Euphrosyne was a revered relic of the Orthodox Church in Belarus, which was made in 1161 by Lazar Bohsha on the order of Saint Euphrosyne of Polatsk and is regarded as a national treasure of Belarus.

Euphrosyne, mother superior of Polatsk Convent, ordered the cross to decorate the new Transfiguration church. The simple cypress cross was decorated with gold, gemstones and enamel, depicting Jesus Christ, John the Baptist, the Theotokos (Mother of God), the Four Evangelists, the archangels Gabriel and Michael, and three patron saints of Euphrosyne and her parents. The work cost 120 hryvnas. Inside, the cross contained pieces of the Holy Cross and other relics.

In the 13th century, the cross was relocated to Smolensk and in 1514 to Moscow. It was returned to Polatsk by Ivan the Terrible in 1563. The cross was thoroughly photographed for the record in 1896. In 1928 the nationalized relic was taken to Minsk, then, in 1929, to Mahilyow, and was locked in a safe box of the regional communist party headquarters.

Disappearance

The cross disappeared during the swift invasion of Belarus (June-August 1941) by German forces during World War II.

It is not known exactly what happened to the cross in 1941. There are at least three different versions (other than destruction by fire or plunder):

 The official Soviet version abruptly stated that the cross was looted by the Germans.
 German paperwork of the Alfred Rosenberg organization recorded a Mahilyow treasure captured by the Germans in Smolensk. However, there is no evidence it was the Polatsk Cross.
 In 1991, the minister of culture of Belarus asserted that the cross, together with other Belarusian treasures, had been evacuated to Moscow.

In 1997, Nikolay Kuzmich, a craftsman from Brest, completed an officially endorsed replica of the cross, now on display in the Polatsk cathedral.

Modern symbolic usage

The Cross of St. Euphrosyne is often used as a national symbol of Belarus. The 1991 version of the Belarusian coat of arms Pahonia and the coat of arms of Vitsebsk Region features a cross resembling the Cross of St. Euphrosyne on the knight's shield. The Cross was also used as a common flag pole ornament with the red-white-red flag of Belarus in 1991–1995.

The Cross is the subject of several postage stamps of Belarus, issued in 1992, 2001 and 2011, and a commemorative coin of Belarus issued in 2007.

The national-democratic opposition movement Young Front has the cross as a main element of its symbol.

See also
 Cross of Lorraine, another variant with two horizontal bars

References

Eastern Orthodoxy in Belarus
Lost works of art
Medieval Belarus
National symbols of Belarus
Eastern Orthodoxy in medieval Russia